Akkireddypalem is a neighborhood situated in southern Visakhapatnam City, India. The area, which falls under the local administrative limits of Greater Visakhapatnam Municipal Corporation, is about 15 km from the city centre of Dwaraka Nagar. Akkireddypalem is located between the neighbourhoods of Sheela Nagar and Nathayyapalem.  There are some industries located here, including Bharat Heavy Electricals and Visakha Dairy.

Transport
APSRTC routes:

References

Neighbourhoods in Visakhapatnam